The Chamdo languages are a group of recently discovered, closely related Sino-Tibetan languages spoken in Chamdo Prefecture, Tibet. Their position within the Sino-Tibetan language family is currently uncertain.

Languages
The Chamdo languages are:

Lamo, gSerkhu
Larong
Drag-yab

Classification
Jiang (2022) provides the following computational phylogenetic classification of the Chamdo languages.

Lexical comparison

Nyima & Suzuki (2019)
Lexical comparisons of numerals in four Chamdo languages from Nyima & Suzuki (2019):

Suzuki & Nyima (2018)
Suzuki & Nyima (2018: 4-6) provide the following lexical items for Lamo, Larong, and Drag-yab.

The lexical data below is based on the following dialects.
Kyilwa 格瓦 dialect of Lamo
Tangre Chaya 达日 (sMarkhams) and Phagpa 坝巴 (mDzogang) dialects of Larong
Razi 热孜 dialect of Drag-yab

Cognates

Non-cognates

Changdu Gazetteer (2005)
The Changdu Gazetteer (2005: 819) provides the following comparative data in Tibetan script. The table below uses Wylie romanization. English translations for the Chinese glosses are also provided.

References

Sino-Tibetan languages
Languages of China
Languages of Tibet